Gajendra Singh may refer to:

Gajendra Singh (producer),  Indian television producer and director
Gajendra Singh Khimsar (born 1957),  MLA from Lohawat Rajasthan
Gajendra Singh (cricketer) (born 1988),  Indian first-class cricketer who plays for Rajasthan
Gajendra Singh Shaktawat (born 1943),  former Indian cricketer
Gajendra Singh Kalyanwat was a landowner (died 2015), self-employed businessman and aspiring politician
Gajendra Singh (politician) (born 1975),  Indian politician and a member of the 16th Legislative Assembly of India
Gajendra Singh Rajukhedi is an Indian politician (born 1964), belonging to Indian National Congress
Gajendra Narayan Singh (1925–2002), Nepali politician and Madhesi activist
Gajendra Narayan Singh (musicologist), Indian musician, writer, and art historian